Vadym Bovtruk (born Kyiv 18 August 1991) is a Ukrainian professional football midfielder who plays for Dinaz Vyshhorod.

Career
Vadym started his career in Nafkom Brovary, from 2008 until 2009. Then he moved to Nyva Vinnytsia, where in the season 2009–10 he for promoted to Ukrainian First League. Here played until 2011, here he played 72 games and he scored 11 goals. In 2011 he moved to Desna Chernihiv, the main team in Chernihiv where he played 142 games and scored 9 goals until 2017, where he got promoted with the club to the Ukrainian First League after the season 2012–13 in Ukrainian Second League.

From 2017 he moved to Obolon Kyiv, and in Polissya Zhytomyr. In 2018 until 2019 he moved Sumy in Ukrainian First League and in 2019 he moved to Dinaz Vyshhorod just promoted to Ukrainian Second League. On 1 May 2021 he scored against Karpaty Halych away at the Enerhetyk Stadium.

Honours
Dinaz Vyshhorod
 Ukrainian Second League: Runner-Up 2020–21

Desna Chernihiv
 Ukrainian Second League: 2012–13
 Ukrainian First League: Runner-up 2016–17

Nyva Vinnytsia
 Ukrainian Second League: 2009–10

References

External links
 Profile from Official Site of FC Dinaz 
 
 

1991 births
Living people
Footballers from Kyiv
Ukrainian footballers
Association football midfielders
FC Desna Chernihiv players
FC Dinaz Vyshhorod players
FC Nafkom Brovary players
FC Nyva Vinnytsia players
FC Polissya Zhytomyr players
PFC Sumy players
FC Obolon-Brovar Kyiv players
Ukrainian First League players
Ukrainian Second League players